The 2022 Big Ten conference football season is the 127th season of college football play for the Big Ten Conference and part of the 2022 NCAA Division I FBS football season. This is the Big Ten's ninth season with 14 teams.

Previous season
Michigan and Ohio State were co-East Division champions, with the Wolverines making their first appearance Big Ten Championship Game due to their head-to-head win over the Buckeyes in 2021. In the West Division, Iowa won the division title and made their second championship game appearance. In that championship game, Michigan defeated Iowa 42–3 to win the Big Ten championship. With that win, the Wolverines landed a spot in the 2021–22 College Football Playoff as the No. 2 seed. The Wolverines lost in the semifinal game of the playoffs to third-seeded and eventual national champion Georgia in the Orange Bowl (national semifinal).

Besides Michigan, nine other Big Ten football teams qualified for bowl games: Iowa, Maryland, Michigan State, Minnesota, Ohio State, Penn State, Purdue, and Wisconsin. Additionally, Rutgers was chosen based upon APR rate to replace Texas A&M, who dropped out of the Gator Bowl due to COVID-19 protocols. The Big Ten overall went 6–4 in postseason games in the 2021 season.

Coaching changes 
There were no head coaching changes amongst Big Ten programs before the 2022 season.  On September 11, Nebraska fired head coach Scott Frost three games into the season and named Mickey Joseph the interim for the remainder of the season.

On October 2, Wisconsin fired head coach Paul Chryst, five games into the Badgers' season and named defensive coordinator Jim Leonhard as interim head coach.

Nebraska named Matt Rhule the 31st head coach in program history on November 26, 2022, one day after finishing their 2022 season.

On November 27, 2022, one day after finishing their respective season, Wisconsin announced the hiring of Luke Fickell to become the Badgers' 31st coach in program history.

On December 8, 2022, Jeff Brohm announced he was leaving Purdue to return to his alma mater, Louisville. On December 13th, the Boilermakers announced the hiring of Illinois defensive coordinator Ryan Walters as their next head coach.

Preseason

Recruiting classes

Big Ten Media Days

Preseason Media Poll

The annual Cleveland.com Preseason Big Ten Media Poll.

Preseason Player of the Year
Below are the results of the annual Preseason Big Ten Player of the Year awards conducted by Cleveland.com.

Preseason awards

All−American Teams

Individual awards

Rankings

Schedule

All times Eastern time.

† denotes Homecoming game

Regular season schedule

Week 0

Week 1

Week 2

Week 3

Week 4

Week 5

Week 6

Week 7

Week 8

Week 9

Week 10

Week 11

Week 12

Week 13

Big Ten Championship Game

Postseason

Bowl games

For the 2020–2025 bowl cycle, The Big Ten will have annually eight appearances in the following bowls: Rose Bowl (unless they are selected for playoffs filled by a Pac-12 team if champion is in the playoffs), Citrus Bowl, Guaranteed Rate Bowl, Las Vegas Bowl, Music City Bowl, Pinstripe Bowl, Quick Lane Bowl, and Outback Bowl. The Big Ten teams will go to a New Year's Six bowl if a team finishes higher than the champions of Power Five conferences in the final College Football Playoff rankings. The Big Ten champion is also eligible for the College Football Playoff if it's among the top four teams in the final CFP ranking.

Rankings are from AP Poll.  All times Eastern Time Zone.

Big Ten records vs other conferences

2022–2023 records against non-conference foes

Post Season

Awards and honors

Player of the week honors

Big Ten Individual Awards

The following individuals won the conference's annual player and coach awards:

All-Conference Teams

2022 Big Ten All-Conference Teams and Awards

Coaches Honorable Mention: ILLINOIS: Isaiah Adams, Tarique Barnes, Zy Crisler, Isaac Darkangelo, Caleb Griffin, Julian Pearl, Isaiah Williams; INDIANA: Charles Campbell, James Evans, Cam Jones, Tiawan Mullen; IOWA: Joe Evans, Kaleb Johnson, Logan Lee, Kaevon Merriweather, Mason Richman, Noah Shannon; MARYLAND: Jakorian Bennett, Jaelyn Duncan, Ami Finau, Delmar Glaze, Roman Hemby, Rakim Jarrett, Colton Spangler; MICHIGAN: Karsen Barnhart, Gemon Green, Kris Jenkins, Mike Sainristil; MICHIGAN STATE: Simeon Barrow, Keon Coleman, J.D. Duplain, Jayden Reed, Nick Samac, Jacob Slade; MINNESOTA: Trill Carter, Aireontae Ersery, Cody Lindenberg, Quentin Redding, Brevyn Spann-Ford, Danny Striggow, Matthew Trickett; NEBRASKA: Anthony Grant, Quinton Newsome, Luke Reimer; NORTHWESTERN: Adetomiwa Adebawore, Bryce Gallagher, Evan Hull, Cameron Mitchell; OHIO STATE: Denzel Burke, Steele Chambers, Mike Hall Jr., Tanner McCalister, Jesse Mirco, Lathan Ransom, Noah Ruggles, Jack Sawyer, Cade Stover, Luke Wypler; PENN STATE: Barney Amor, Sean Clifford, Curtis Jacobs, Hunter Nourzad, Chop Robinson, Nicholas Singleton, Nick Tarburton, Parker Washington, Sal Wormley; PURDUE: Branson Deen, Jalen Graham, Kydran Jenkins, Charlie Jones, Devin Mockobee, Jack Sullivan, Cory Trice; RUTGERS: Christian Izien, Max Melton, Avery Young; WISCONSIN: Tanor Bortolini, Isaac Guerendo, Jack Nelson, Maema Njongmeta, Joe Tippmann.

Media Honorable Mention: ILLINOIS: Tarique Barens, Seth Coleman, Isaac Darkangelo, Tommy DeVito, Caleb Griffin, Gabe Jacas, Julian Pearl, Alex Pihlstrom, Kendall Smith, Isaiah Williams; INDIANA: Charles Campbell, Aaron Casey, James Evans, Cam Jones, Dasan McCullough, Tiawan Mullen; IOWA: Kaleb Johnson, Luke Lachey, Logan Lee, Kaevon Merriweather, Noah Shannon; MARYLAND: Deonte Banks, Jaishawn Barham, Jakorian Bennett, Beau Brade, Corey Dyches, Jaelyn Duncan, Ami Finau, Roman Hemby, Rakim Jarrett, Chad Ryland, Colton Spangler, Taulia Tagovailoa; MICHIGAN: Karsen Barnhart, Gemon Green, Jaylen Harrell, Kris Jenkins, Makari Paige, Luke Schoonmaker; MICHIGAN STATE: Simeon Barrow, J.D. Duplain, Xavier Henderson, Jayden Reed, Nick Samac, Jacob Slade; MINNESOTA: Kyler Baugh, Quinn Carroll, Aireontae Ersery, Chuck, Filiaga, Jordan Howden, Cody Lindenberg, Thomas Rush, Terell Smith, Mariano Sori-Marin, Brevyn Spann-Ford, Matthew Trickett; NEBRASKA: Anthony Grant, Luke Reimer; NORTHWESTERN: Evan Hull, Cameron Mitchell; OHIO STATE: Denzel Burke, Steele Chambers, TreVeyon Henderson, Tanner McCalister, Jesse Mirco, Lathan Ransom, Tyleik Williams; PENN STATE: Kaytron Allen, Sean Clifford, Johnny Dixon, Bryce Effner, Adisa Isaac, Curtis Jacobs, Hunter Nourzad, Jake Pinegar, Chop Robinson, Juice Scruggs, Brenton Strange, Parker Washington, Sal Wormley; PURDUE: Cam Allen, Jalen Graham, Gus Hartwig, Spencer Holstege, Lawrence Johnson, Charlie Jones, Marcus Mbow, Devin Mockobee, Jack Sullivan, Cory Trice; RUTGERS: Christian Braswell, Aron Cruickshank, Christian Izien, Deion Jennings, Aaron Lewis, Max Melton, Avery Young; WISCONSIN: Keeanu Benton, Tanor Bortolini, Chimere Dike, C. J. Goetz, Isaac Guerendo, Jack Nelson, Joe Tippmann, Jordan Turner.

Home attendance

Bold – Exceed capacity
†Season High

2023 NFL Draft

The following list includes all Big Ten players who were drafted in the 2023 NFL Draft

Head coaches

''Through 2022 season'

References